South Church Street Historic District may refer to:

South Church Street Historic District (Tupelo, Mississippi), listed on the National Register of Historic Places in Lee County, Mississippi
South Church Street Historic District (Lewisburg, West Virginia), listed on the National Register of Historic Places in Greenbrier County, West Virginia